Bassitt is a surname of Norman origin, originating as a surname for someone of small stature. Notable people with the surname include:

Chris Bassitt (born 1989), American professional baseball pitcher
Trevor Bassitt (born 1998), American track and field athlete

See also
Bady Bassitt, a municipality in the state of São Paulo, Brazil
Bassett (surname)